Kilgoris is a town in Narok County, Kenya. The town has a population of 70,475 (2019 census). Kilgoris is one of two major urban centres in Narok County; the other being Narok town.

Maasai are the indigenous and prominent tribe in the area. Past ethnic clashes have occurred between the maasai and the surrounding tribes due to land issues (e.g., cattle raiding). It is the divisional headquarters of the former Kilgoris Division (currently Trans-Mara West Dub-County under the devolved administration system ) The town is located about 60 km west of the popular Masai Mara National Reserve, the number of tourists visiting the town has increased over a period of time due to increase in the hospitality industry in the town as well. Hotels such as South West time, there is a murram road from the town through the neighbouring town of Lolgorien to the Mara and another to Enoosaen to the West, and another to Kiridon through the famous  Oloololo gate side of the park. It is an alternative to Narok road, especially for anyone coming from Western Kenya.

Billy Konchellah, winner of two consecutive 800m World Championships, and David Rudisha, current world record holder and reigning Olympic champion in 800 metres, are from Kilgoris.

Kilgoris was previously the capital of the former Trans Mara District.
Kilgoris constituency Member of Parliament is Hon. Amb. Julius Ole Sunkuli who initially  served from 1992 to 2002 and made a comeback in the 2022 Kenyas general elections as the area MP until Now. He was preceded by Hon. Gideon Konchella, Ole Sompisha and Hon John Konchella.

Kilgoris is the home of the first Narok County governor HE Samuel Kuntai Tunai, it is highly hospitable with inhabitants mostly conservative.
Kilgoris town does have many  restaurants to dine in including the infamous Lenamo springs,south west,Nakuyana and Sanutu  gardens and many more

kilgoris is a build up of many religions all together :the christians,Muslims,Hindus and the non belivers.

References

Populated places in Narok County